Events from the year 1850 in the United States.

Incumbents

Federal Government 
 President: Zachary Taylor (W-Kentucky) (until July 9), Millard Fillmore (W-New York) (starting July 9)
 Vice President: Millard Fillmore (W-New York) (until July 9), vacant (starting July 9)
 Chief Justice: Roger B. Taney (Maryland)
 Speaker of the House of Representatives: Howell Cobb (D-Georgia)
 Congress: 31st

Events

January–March
 January – Sacramento floods.
 January 29 – Henry Clay introduces the Compromise of 1850 to Congress.
 January 31 – The University of Rochester is chartered in Rochester, New York; it admits its first students in November
 c. January–February – The Liberty Head double eagle first issued for commerce.
 February 8–17 – Battle at Fort Utah: The Nauvoo Legion kills Timpanogos hostile to the Mormon settlement at Fort Utah on the orders of Brigham Young.
 February 28 – The University of Utah opens in Salt Lake City.
 March 7 – United States Senator Daniel Webster gives his "Seventh of March" speech, in which he endorses the Compromise of 1850, in order to prevent a possible civil war.
 March 16 – Nathaniel Hawthorne's historical novel The Scarlet Letter is published in Boston, Massachusetts.
 March 19 – American Express is founded by Henry Wells and William Fargo.

April–June
 April 4 – Los Angeles is incorporated as a city in California.
 April 15 – San Francisco is incorporated as a city in California.
 April 19 – Clayton–Bulwer Treaty is signed by the United States and Great Britain, allowing both countries to share Nicaragua and not claim complete control over the proposed Nicaragua Canal.
 May 7 – The brigantine  is loaned to the United States Navy.
 May 23 – The  puts to sea from New York City to search for Franklin's lost expedition in the Arctic.
 June – Harper's Magazine published as a new monthly in New York City.
 June 1 – The 1850 United States census shows that 11.2% of the population classed as "Negro" are of mixed race.
 June 3 – Traditional date of Kansas City, Missouri's founding: it is incorporated by Jackson County, Missouri as the "Town of Kansas".

July–September

 July 1 – St. Mary's Institute (the future University of Dayton) admits its first pupils in Dayton, Ohio.
 July 9 – President Zachary Taylor dies in office; Vice President Millard Fillmore becomes the 13th President of the United States.
 July 10 – President Fillmore is sworn in.
 July 14 – John Gorrie makes the first public demonstration of his ice-making machine, in Apalachicola, Florida.
 September 9 
 California is admitted to the Union as the 31st state (see History of California and An Act for the Admission of the State of California).
 Utah Territory is established.
 New Mexico Territory is organized by order of the U.S. Congress.
 September 18 – The Fugitive Slave Act of 1850 is passed by the U.S. Congress. Harriet Tubman becomes an official conductor of the Underground Railroad.

October–December
 October 19 – Phi Kappa Sigma International Fraternity founded at the University of Pennsylvania.
 October 28 – Delegate Edward Ralph May delivers a speech on behalf of African American suffrage to the Indiana Constitutional Convention.

Undated
 The American system of watch manufacturing starts in Roxbury, Massachusetts, with the Waltham Watch Company.
 Mayer Lehman arrives from Germany to join his siblings in Lehman Brothers merchant business in Montgomery, Alabama.
 Allan Pinkerton forms the North-Western Police Agency, later the Pinkerton National Detective Agency, in Chicago.
 Astronomer Maria Mitchell becomes the first woman member of the American Association for the Advancement of Science.
 The temperance organization, International Organisation of Good Templars, is established in Utica, New York, as the order of the Knights of Jericho.
 One of the original segments of the historic Pacific Highway in Washington (state) in Clark and Cowlitz counties is established.

Ongoing
 California Gold Rush (1848–1855)

Births
 January 1 – John Barclay Armstrong, Texas Ranger lieutenant and a U.S. Marshal (died 1913)
 January 10 – John Wellborn Root, Chicago architect (died 1891)
 January 18 – Seth Low, educator (died 1916)
 January 24 – Mary Noailles Murfree, novelist (died 1922)
 January 27 – Samuel Gompers, labor union leader (died 1924)
 January 28 – Edward Merritt Hughes, U.S. Navy officer (died 1903)
 February 1 – Emma Churchman Hewitt, author and journalist (died 1921)
 February 2 – Cassius Aurelius Boone, Mayor of Orlando and businessman (died 1917)
 February 6 – Elizabeth Williams Champney, author (died 1922)
 February 8 
 Kate Chopin, writer (died 1904)
 Charles Rockwell Lanman, Sanskrit scholar (died 1941)
 February 15 – Albert B. Cummins, U.S. Senator from Iowa from 1908 to 1926 (died 1926)
 February 27
 Henry E. Huntington, railroad pioneer and art collector (died 1927)
 Laura E. Richards, author (died 1943)
 March 9 – Daniel B. Towner, hymn composer (died 1919)
 March 26 – Edward Bellamy, Utopian novelist and socialist (died 1898)
 March 31 – Charles Doolittle Walcott, invertebrate paleontologist (died 1927)
 April 3 – Zina P. Young Card, Mormon leader and women's rights activist (died 1931)
 April 8 – John Peters, baseball player (died 1924)
 April 10 – Mary Emilie Holmes, geologist and educator (died 1906)
 April 11 
 Rosetta Luce Gilchrist, physician and author (died 1921)
 Isidor Rayner, U.S. senator from Maryland from 1905 to 1912 (died 1912)
 April 18 – Joseph Labadie, labor organizer (died 1933)
 April 20 – Daniel Chester French, sculptor (died 1931)
 April 30 
 Ruth Alice Armstrong, temperance activist (died 1901)
 Mrs. Alex. McVeigh Miller, novelist (died 1937)
 May 8 – Ross Barnes, baseball player and manager (died 1915)
 May 12 – Henry Cabot Lodge, statesman (died 1924)
 May 14 – Alva Adams, 3-time Governor of Colorado (died 1922)
 June 3 – Albert M. Todd, businessman and politician (died 1931)
 June 5 – Pat Garrett, bartender and sheriff (died 1908)
 June 15 – Charles Hazelius Sternberg, paleontologist (died 1943)
 June 18 
 Cyrus H. K. Curtis, magazine publisher (died 1933)
Alice Moore McComas, author, editor, lecturer and reformer (died 1919)
 June 21 – Daniel Carter Beard, Scouting pioneer (died 1941)
 July 2 – Robert Ridgway, ornithologist (died 1929)
 July 7 – William E. Mason, U.S. Senator from Illinois from 1897 to 1903 (died 1921)
 July 8 – Charles Rockwell Lanman, Sanskrit scholar (died 1941)
 July 11 – Annie Armstrong, Baptist leader (died 1938)
 July 12 – Newell Sanders, businessman and politician (died 1938)
 July 18 – Rose Hartwick Thorpe, poet (died 1939)
 July 20 – John G. Shedd, businessman (died 1926)
 July 25 – Lydia J. Newcomb Comings, educator (died 1946)
 July 28 – William Whittingham Lyman, vintner (died 1921)
 July 31 – Robert Love Taylor, Tennessee congressman (died 1912)
 August 28 – Charles H. Aldrich, Solicitor General of the U.S. (died 1929)
 September 2 – Eugene Field, poet and essayist (died 1895)
 September 6 – Marion Howard Brazier, journalist (died 1935)
 October 1
David R. Francis, politician (died 1927)
Thomas Vincent Welch, politician (died 1903)
 October 14 – Newton E. Mason, rear admiral (died 1945)
 October 30 – John Patton, Jr., U.S. Senator from Michigan from 1894 to 1895 (died 1907)
 November 5 – Ella Wheeler Wilcox, poet (died 1919)
 November 18 – John S. Armstrong, real estate developer (died 1908)
 December 9 – Emma Abbott, operatic soprano (died 1891)
 December 21 – William Wallace Lincoln, third son of Abraham Lincoln and Mary Todd Lincoln (died 1862)
 December 23 – Louise Reed Stowell, scientist and author (died 1932)
 December 25 – Florence Griswold, art curator (died 1937)

Deaths
 February 1 – Edward Baker Lincoln, second son of Abraham Lincoln (born 1846)
 March 3 – Oliver Cowdery, religious leader (born 1806)
 March 21 – Miguel Pedrorena, early settler of San Diego, California (born c. 1808)
 March 28 – Gerard Brandon, fourth and sixth Governor of Mississippi from 1825 to 1826 and from 1826 to 1832 (born 1788)
 March 31 – John C. Calhoun, seventh Vice President of the United States from 1825 to 1832 (born 1782)
 April 12 – Adoniram Judson, Congregationalist and later Baptist missionary (born 1788)
 April 24 – John Norvell, U.S. Senator from Michigan from 1837 to 1841 (born 1789)
 May 16 – William Hendricks, U.S. Senator from Indiana from 1825 to 1837 (born 1782)
 July 9 – Zachary Taylor, 12th President of the United States from 1849 to 1850 (born 1784)
 July 19 – Margaret Fuller, journalist, literary critic and women's rights advocate, presumed drowned (born 1810)
 November 19 – Richard Mentor Johnson, ninth Vice President of the United States from 1837 to 1841, U.S. Senator from Kentucky from 1819 to 1829 (born 1780)

See also
Timeline of United States history (1820–1859)

References

External links
 

 
1850s in the United States
United States
United States
Years of the 19th century in the United States